Treatment effect may refer to:

 Design of experiments
 Average treatment effect
 Multivalued treatment